KZAS-LP (95.1 FM, "Radio Tierra") is a low-power FM radio station licensed to serve Hood River, Oregon, United States.  The station is owned by Radio Tierra .

The station was assigned the KZAS-LP call sign by the Federal Communications Commission on March 8, 2003.

Programming
KZAS-LP station airs a Spanish-language community radio format.  "Radio Tierra" features a mix of music, news, and locally produced community interest programming.

Translators
KZAS-LP programming is also carried on multiple broadcast translator stations to extend or improve the coverage area of the station.

See also
List of community radio stations in the United States

References

External links
KZAS-LP official website
 

ZAS-LP
ZAS-LP
Community radio stations in the United States
ZAS-LP
Hood River, Oregon
2003 establishments in Oregon